Mambéré is a prefecture in the Central African Republic. In 2022, the prefecture had a population of around 265,479. Mambéré has a size of 15,740 km2. Carnot is the capital of the prefecture.

History 
Along with Lim-Pendé and Ouham Fafa, Mambéré Prefecture was established on 10 December 2020. Previously all sub-prefectures and communes of Mambéré were part of Mambéré-Kadéï.

Administration 
Mambéré was divided into four sub-prefectures and five communes:

References 

Prefectures of the Central African Republic
States and territories established in 2020